Nacional Esporte Clube Ltda. is a football club from the south-east Brazilian state of Minas Gerais.

The club, founded on 28 June 2008 in Coronel Fabriciano as Fabriciano Futebol Clube, changed its name after it moved in March 2010 to Nova Serrana. There it  played in the Estádio Municipal. In 2013 Nacional established itself in Patos de Minas.

Nacional de Nova Serrana won the Campeonato Mineiro Segunda Divisão in 2010.

Achievements

 Campeonato Mineiro Segunda Divisão: 
 Winners (1): 2010

References

 
Association football clubs established in 2008
Football clubs in Minas Gerais
2008 establishments in Brazil